"Boombastic" or "Mr. Boombastic" is a song by Jamaican musical artist Shaggy, released on June 5, 1995 as the second single from his third studio album, Boombastic (1995). After being used in an ad for Levi's, it achieved commercial success in many countries, including Ireland, UK, Sweden, New Zealand, and Australia, where it topped the singles charts. It spent a week at number one on the US Billboard R&B chart, and a similar stint atop the UK Singles Chart. It also reached number three on the Billboard Hot 100. A remix featuring Sting International, which features a sample of Marvin Gaye's "Let's Get It On", was released in January 1996. The latter is featured on some versions of the Boombastic album as a bonus track.

Chart performance
"Boombastic" was a major hit all over the world, becoming Shaggy's most successful song to date. It peaked at number one in Australia, El Salvador, Ireland, Italy, New Zealand, Sweden, and the UK, where it topped the UK Singles Chart in September 1995. In Europe, the song entered the top 5 also in Austria (2), Belgium (4), Denmark (2), Finland (2), Germany (2), Iceland (4), the Netherlands (4), Norway (2), Scotland (2), Spain (3), and Switzerland (3). In France, it was a top 10 hit (7). On the Eurochart Hot 100, "Boombastic" also reached number one in November 1995. In the US, the song peaked at number one on the Billboard Hot R&B/Hip-Hop Songs chart and number three on the Billboard Hot 100. In Canada, it reached number eight on the RPM Dance/Urban chart.

"Boombastic" earned a Gold record in Austria (25,000), France (250,000) and Germany (250,000), while receiving a Platinum record in Australia (70,000), New Zealand (10,000), Norway (10,000), the UK (600,000), and the US (1,200,000).

Critical reception
"Boombastic" received mainly favorable reviews from music critics. AllMusic editor David Jeffries viewed the song as "pivotal" for the musician. Larry Flick from Billboard noted that it "jerks about with a hypnotic groove that owes as much to hip hop and rave/pop as it does to traditional island music. Shaggy's toasting is quite friendly to mainstream pop ears, and he masterfully twists and bends the chorus. Primed for immediate picking by jeep listeners, smoking track comes in two radical versions that are designed to lure both street kids and their more mature counterparts." Chuck Campbell from Knoxville News Sentinel declared it as "a confident come-on" driven by the singer's "gravelly purr". He added that it's "making a deeper mark on the American psyche. Unfortunately for Shaggy, the song sounds more like a summer novelty hit than a trendsetting milestone." Heidi Siegmund Cuda from Los Angeles Times felt "Boombastic" "is by far this summer’s most enchanting radio tune." A reviewer from Music Week gave the track four out of five, stating that being used in the latest Levi's ad, it's "guaranteeing the Shagster another UK smash with this slo-mo pop ragga which samples Marvin Gaye's "Let's Get It On"." John Kilgo from The Network Forty declared it a "reggae/rap masterpiece".

Gerald Martinez from New Sunday Times found that "with sparse, hypnotic backing, Shaggy's boastful rapping carries the song." A reviewer from People Magazine opined that the album "is more like the real reggae thing", and "the raw title song is the style's most uncompromising Top 10 trip yet." James Hamilton from the RM Dance Update described it as "gruffy twiddly-diddled". Al Weisel from Rolling Stone viewed it as "a stripped-clown dub masterpiece, a percussive cacophony of samples, sound effects and a clanging piano. Shaggy's baritone growl oozes a sexuality that recalls both the dance-hall swagger of Shabba Ranks and theatrical self-deprecation of ska king Prince Buster." Mark Sutherland from Smash Hits gave "Boombastic" two out of five, calling it a "gruff, grinding ragga-lite" track. David Sinclair from The Times described it as "an entertaining tribute to the singer's boundless sex appeal", noting Shaggy's "mischievous glee, the Rs rolling off his tongue like the purr of a big cat." He added, "Set to a plonking, one-note piano riff and minimalist reggae beat, Boombastic is one of those feelgood dance records that seems to conjure a special magic out of thin air. Like the hero in the ad, it will be flying out of shops everywhere."

Retrospective response
Bill Lamb from About.com said Shaggy "exhibits oodles of personal charm alongside the funky grooves" of "Boombastic", picking it as one of the best songs from 1990s. Tom Ewing of Freaky Trigger said the musician is "the benevolent monarch of this world, giving a comical, flirtatious, crowd-tickling performance, his army of mechanical instruments dancing in and out of his phrasing. His main trick here is using his voice like a yo-yo, winding his vowels out on "rohhhhhh-" before he flicks the word back "-mantic!"."

Music video
A music video was produced to promote the single and was later published on Shaggy's official YouTube channel in March 2009. It features him performing in and outside an old house, surrounded by dancing women and flickering lights. The video had generated more than 175 million views as of October 2022.

Track listings

United Kingdom
 CD single
 "Boombastic" (7" Original Edit) – 3:52
 "Boombastic" (StoneBridge Vocal Remix) – 5:59

 Maxi single
 "Boombastic" (7" Original Edit) – 3:52
 "Boombastic" (StoneBridge Vocal Remix) – 3:52
 "Boombastic" (Wag Ya Tail Remix) – 4:19
 "Boombastic" (Firefox & 4Tree BassBoom Remix) – 6:32
 "Boombastic" (Sting vs. Shaggy Remix) – 5:59
 "Boombastic" (Boom the Dancehall Dub) – 6:05

 Cassette
 "Boombastic" (7" Original Edit) – 3:52
 "Boombastic" (StoneBridge Vocal Remix) – 3:52
 "Boombastic" (Firefox & 4Tree BassBoom Remix) – 6:32
 "Boombastic" (Sting vs. Shaggy Remix) – 5:59

 7" vinyl
 "Boombastic" (7" Original Edit) – 3:52
 "Boombastic" (Sting vs. Shaggy Remix) – 5:59

 12" vinyl
 "Boombastic" (LP Version) – 4:08
 "Boombastic" (StoneBridge Vocal Remix) – 3:52
 "Boombastic" (Wag Ya Tail Remix) – 4:19
 "Boombastic" (Firefox & 4Tree BassBoom Remix) – 6:32
 "Boombastic" (Sting vs. Shaggy Remix) – 5:59
 "Boombastic" (Boom the Dancehall Dub) – 6:05

 12" vinyl – Jungle Mixes
 "Boombastic" (Firefox & 4Tree BassBoom Remix) – 6:32
 "Boombastic" (Boom the Dancehall Dub) – 6:05

United States
 CD single
 "Boombastic" (LP Version) – 4:08
 "Boombastic" (Sting vs. Shaggy Remix) – 4:16
 "Boombastic" (Firefox & 4Tree BassBoom Remix) – 6:32
 "In the Summertime" – 4:00
 "Gal Yu a Pepper" – 4:16

 Cassette
 "Boombastic" (LP Version) – 4:08
 "Boombastic" (Sting vs. Shaggy Remix) – 4:16
 "In the Summertime" – 4:00
 "Gal Yu a Pepper" – 4:16

 12" vinyl
 "Boombastic" (LP Version) – 4:08
 "Boombastic" (Sting vs. Shaggy Remix) – 4:16
 "Boombastic" (Boom the Dancehall Dub) – 6:05
 "In the Summertime" – 4:00
 "Gal Yu a Pepper" – 4:16

Charts

Weekly charts

Year-end charts

Certifications

In popular culture
The song was featured in the 2006 animated film Barnyard, sung by the character "Biggie Cheese". Alongside its corresponding scene, the song subsequently became an internet meme about a decade later. The song was also used in the 2007 film Mr. Bean's Holiday.

References

External links

1994 songs
1995 singles
Number-one singles in Australia
European Hot 100 Singles number-one singles
Irish Singles Chart number-one singles
Number-one singles in Italy
Number-one singles in New Zealand
Number-one singles in Sweden
UK Singles Chart number-one singles
Shaggy (musician) songs
Songs written by Shaggy (musician)